Theodore Lee Croker (July 18, 1985) is an American jazz trumpeter, composer, producer and vocalist. He is a Grammy Award nominee, three-time Echo Award nominee, as well as a Theodore Presser Award recipient.

Croker has released seven studio albums — Fundamentals (2006), In the Tradition (2009), Afro Physicist (2014), Escape Velocity (2016), Star People Nation (2019), Blk2Life/A Future Past (2021) and Love Quantum (2022). He has also been featured on J. Cole's 4 Your Eyez Only (2016) and Common's Black America Again (2016) and Ari Lennox's debut album, Shea Butter Baby (2019).

Early life 
Croker was born July 18, 1985, in Leesburg, Florida, and is the second son of William Henry Croker, a civil rights activist, high school principal and farmer, and Alicia Cheatham, a guidance counselor, and the grandson of Grammy Award-winning trumpeter Doc Cheatham.

Croker is a graduate of the Oberlin Conservatory of Music.

Career

2007–2013: Asia 
In 2013, Croker returned to the United States after a seven-year stay in Shanghai, China, where he broadened his concept of jazz to encompass other genres such as salsa, fusion-rock, R&B, hip-hop and blues. While in Shanghai, he held a five-month residency at Shanghai's House of Blues. Soon after that he was hired as the house band for Asia Uncut Star Network, a late-night television show modeled on The Tonight Show where he served as music director, bandleader and in-house composer until mid-2010.

In July 2010, Croker became the first artist in residence at Shanghai's Peace Hotel Jazz Bar, the oldest and longest-running music club in China. (Both the Jazz Bar and the hotel, now the Fairmont Peace Hotel, date back to the 1920s when it was known as the Cathay Hotel.)

It was also in 2010 that Croker met and performed for the first time with vocalist Dee Dee Bridgewater. Over the next two years, Bridgewater and Croker kept in touch, exchanging musical ideas. Finally in 2014 Bridgewater produced his third studio album Afro Physicist with him, that featured herself as vocalist on three tracks, guest appearances by vibraphonist Stefon Harris on an interpretation of Stevie Wonder's "Visions", and fellow trumpeter Roy Hargrove surprisingly sings on a composition of his own that Croker then arranged. A solid rhythm section with Karriem Riggins on drums and keyboarder Sullivan Fortner who already played on his first two albums backs the squad of reed and brass players that plays Croker's in part lavish arrangements.

2016–2019: The Messenger, Star People Nation 
On March 1, the first single off Star People Nation was released, which paid homage to the jazz musician Elvin Jones, titled "The Messenger" featuring guest pianist ELEW. Croker states in an article from Earmilk, "How we swing our quarter note is the basis of all black music. It's the beat, and this song was made to reflect the power in that swing." "The Messenger" was arranged and recorded in Brooklyn, New York. It was mixed and mastered by Grammy Award-winning engineer, producer, and arranger Bob Power. On April 11, Croker's second lead single was premiered by Afropunk. The track is titled "Understand Yourself" featuring Jamaican reggae artist Chronixx. Qwest TV by Quincy Jones interviewed the composer about Star People Nation, which released on May 17. A music review by Floriane Esnault from Qwest TV stated, contrary to the political accents that are perhaps contained within the title Star People Nation, Croker refused to enter into this easy "hype" that he sees many musicians devoting themselves to according to. Croker then responded by saying, "I know that many people use jazz to spice up their music, politically, but don't give back to it because they don't learn it and don't respect the masters or their ancestors."

2019: Das Feierabendhaus der BASF, Orchestra debut 
In 2019, China Moses and Theo Croker, along with the DVRK Funk band double headlined in Ludwigshafen, Germany at the Das Feierabendhaus der BASF. This time, Fawzi Haimor conducted.

Discography

References

External links 

 
 

1985 births
Living people
African-American jazz musicians
American jazz bandleaders
American jazz singers
American male trumpeters
American jazz composers
21st-century trumpeters
American male jazz composers
21st-century African-American male singers
20th-century African-American male singers
Arbors Records artists
Okeh Records artists